The 1948–49 Serie A season was the 16th season of the Serie A, the top level of ice hockey in Italy. Nine teams participated in the league, and HC Diavoli Rossoneri Milano won the championship.

First round

Group A

Group B

Group C

Final round

External links
 Season on hockeytime.net

1948–49 in Italian ice hockey
Serie A (ice hockey) seasons
Italy